The War Order of the German Cross, normally abbreviated to the German Cross or Deutsches Kreuz, was instituted by Adolf Hitler on 28 September 1941. It was awarded in two divisions: in gold for repeated acts of bravery or military leadership; and in silver for distinguished non-combat war service. The German Cross in Gold ranked higher than the Iron Cross First Class but below the Knight's Cross of the Iron Cross, while the German Cross in Silver ranked higher than the War Merit Cross First Class with Swords but below the Knight's Cross of the War Merit Cross with Swords.

Eligibility
The German Cross was issued in two versions: gold and silver (the color of the laurel wreath around the swastika). The gold version was awarded to military personnel for repeated acts of bravery in combat, or of military leadership, with 6–8 acts as a rule of thumb. The silver version was awarded for multiple distinguished services in the war effort and was considered a continuation of the War Merit Cross with swords. Where a recipient had been awarded both the silver and gold versions, only the gold version was authorized for wear.

Article three of the law governing the German Cross states that to qualify for the German Cross in gold or silver, the recipient must be a holder of the Iron Cross (1939) 1st Class or Clasp to the 1914 Iron Cross 1st Class, or the War Merit Cross 1st Class with Swords. The award of the German Cross was not a prerequisite for the award of the Knight's Cross of either the Iron Cross or War Merit Cross, and the German Cross could be awarded to Knight's Cross holders.

While civilians were not eligible, awards could be made to members of uniformed formations including the police and railway workers.

From 30 August 1944, recipients of the gold class of the Close Combat Clasp were normally also awarded the German Cross in gold, without the need for further justification, although the additional award was not made in all cases.

While estimates vary, approximately 24,204 gold and 1,114 silver crosses were awarded.

Appearance
The order consists of a star badge, containing a swastika. It had a diameter of 6.5 cm and was worn on the right-hand side of the tunic.

From June 1942 the gold version was officially available in cloth form, for easier wear on the combat uniform. This had the same dimensions as the original decoration, with the wreath circling the swastika, the only metal part of the badge. The backing cloth reflected the arm of service: field grey for the army, or navy dark blue or air force pale blue. 

Twenty specimen copies of a special grade, the German Cross in Gold with Diamonds, were manufactured in 1942, but this grade was never formally instituted or bestowed.

1957 version
The wear of Nazi-era decorations was banned in Germany after the war, as was any display of the swastika. In 1957, the Federal Republic of Germany authorized the wear of alternative de-nazified replacement versions of a number of war decorations. These included the German Cross, with the swastika replaced by a representation of the Iron Cross for the gold division, and the War Merit Cross with Swords for the silver division. Qualifying members of the Bundeswehr wore the award on their ribbon bar, represented by a small replica of the decoration on a field grey ribbon.

Recipients
Select recipients of both gold and silver grades included:
Major Josef Gangl, 8 March 1945 (gold)
SS-Gruppenführer and Lieutenant General of the Police Odilo Globocnik, 7 February 1945 (gold) & 20 January 1945 (silver)
SS-Standartenführer Rudolf Lange, 6th of February 1945 (Gold) awarded posthumously by Adolf Hitler.         
 SS-Gruppenführer Bruno Streckenbach, 15 December 1943 (gold)
Major General Ernst Merk, 11 February 1944 (gold) & 6 July 1942 (silver)
SS-Standartenführer and Colonel of the Police Walther Rauff, 7 February 1945 (gold) & 20 May 1943 (silver)
General Felix Schwalbe, 7 December 1944 (gold) & 30 November 1943 (silver)
Lieutenant General Bodo Zimmermann, 25 September 1944 (gold) & 15 February 1943 (silver)
SS-Hauptsturmführer Alfred-Ingemar Berndt, 17 July 1943 (gold)
SS-Sturmbannführer Wilhelm Mohnke, 26 December 1941 (gold)
SS-Obersturmbannführer Fritz Knoechlein, 15 November 1942 (gold)
Lieutenant General Walter Krupinski, 27 August 1942 (gold)
Luftwaffe Major Günther Specht, 25 November 1943 (gold)

Foreign recipients
In October 1942, eligibility for the German Cross in Gold was extended to the armed forces of allied countries on the same basis as awards to German forces.

Select foreign recipients of the German Cross in Gold include:

Belgium
 SS-Standartenführer Léon Degrelle, 9 October 1944

Croatia
Lieutenant Cvitan Galić, 23 June 1943
1st Lieutenant Mato Dukovac

Estonia
Senior Lieutenant , 30 December 1944

Finland
General Erik Heinrichs, 17 August 1943
Lieutenant General Jarl Lundqvist, 9 November 1943
Lieutenant General Karl Lennart Oesch, 5 August 1944,
SS-Obersturmführer , 28 February 1945

Italy
Vice Admiral Luigi Sansonetti, 18 January 1942
Marshal Ettore Bastico, 5 December 1942
General Enea Navarini, 21 December 1942
Colonel General Rino Corso Fougier ,18 January 1943

Latvia
Untersturmführer Kārlis Mūsiņš
Standartenführer Vilis Janums, 1 March 1945

Romania
General Gheorghe Avramescu, 25 October 1942
Major General Leonard Mociulschi, 25 October 1942
Major General Ermil Gheorghiu, 11 February 1943
Captain Nicolae Dabija, 10 February 1944

Spain
Major General Emilio Estéban Infantes y Martín, 9 April 1943

In all, some 26 non-German volunteers of the Waffen-SS from Belgium, Denmark, Estonia, Finland, Hungary, Latvia, Netherlands and Norway received the German Cross in Gold.

Nicknames
Colonel Hans von Luck called it "Hitler's fried egg", in response to its gaudiness.
Another name for the decoration was "The Party Reflector for the Near-Sighted"

References
Citations

Bibliography

1941 establishments in Germany
Awards established in 1941
Courage awards
Military awards and decorations of Nazi Germany
Recipients of the German Cross